ESL One Cologne 2015 was the sixth Counter-Strike: Global Offensive Major Championship that was held from August 14–18, 2015 at the Lanxess Arena in Cologne. It was organized by Electronic Sports League. The Cologne event was the first ESL tournament that required competitors to take drug tests, which all came up negative. The tournament had a total prize pool of US$250,000. The online livestream was viewed by around 27 million viewers with a peak of 1.3 million concurrent viewers.

Eight teams were in the playoffs. Fnatic, Luminosity Gaming, Natus Vincere, Ninjas in Pyjamas, Team EnVyUs, Team SoloMid, and Virtus.pro
were returning Legends. Team Kinguin was the only new Legend in the tournament, replacing mousesports, which failed to make the top eight. Fnatic, which defeated Luminosity Gaming and Virtus.pro, was the winner of the event after defeating Team EnVyUs, which defeated Natus Vincere and Team SoloMid, 2–0. Fnatic was the first team to have consecutive major titles and would be the only team to do so until SK Gaming (which was Luminosity Gaming at this tournament) when the Brazilian team won MLG Columbus 2016 and ESL One Cologne 2016.

Format
The top eight teams from ESL One Katowice 2015 ("Legends") received direct invitations to Katowice. In addition, eight other teams (the "Challengers") emerged from offline qualifiers: four from the European qualifier, two from the Asian qualifier, and two from the North American qualifier.

Teams were split up into four groups, and all group matches were best-of-ones. In the first group stage, the highest seed played the lowest seed in each group and the second and third seeds played each other. The winner of those two matches then played each other to determine which team moved on to the playoff stage; the loser of this match received a "high seed" in the second group stage. The two losers from the initial matches were given "low seeds" in the second group stage, while the high seed received a bye. In the second group stage, the groups were shuffled so that teams faced new opponents. However, each group still contained one high seed and two low seeds. The two low seeds in each group played each other, and the winner of that match played the high seed in the group. The winner of that match qualified for the playoff stage.

The playoffs bracket consisted of eight teams, two from each group. All of these matches were best-of-three, single elimination. Teams advanced in the bracket until a winner was decided.

Map pool
There were seven maps to choose from. However, Nuke was taken out of the active map pool and Train was brought back in for the first time since the second Major, EMS One Katowice 2014. Before each match in the group stage, both teams banned two maps. The map for the match was then randomly selected from the remaining three maps. In the playoffs, each team first banned one map, then chose one map. The two chosen maps were the first two maps in the best-of-three. If the series were to require a third map, the map was randomly selected from the three remaining maps.

Qualifiers
Four teams from the European Qualifier, two teams from the Asian Qualifier, and two teams from the North American Qualifier moved on to the major.

Sixteen European teams were placed in two separate brackets. Two teams from each bracket moved on to the major. In the Asian and North American Qualifiers, eight teams were placed in two groups and were played out like in previous majors' group stages. The top two moved on to a four team bracket. The winners of the matches move on to the major.

European Qualifier

Asian Qualifier

North American Qualifier

Broadcast talent
Hosts
 Oliver James "OJ Borg" Borg D'Anastasi
 William "Chobra" Cho

Analysts
 Henry "HenryG" Greer
 Robin "Fifflaren" Johansson
 Casper "cadiaN" Møller
 Jason "moses" O'Toole

Commentators
 Anders Blume
 Jason "JKaplan" Kaplan
 Auguste "Semmler" Massonnat
 Joe Miller
 Alex "Machine" Richardson
 Lauren "Pansy" Scott
 Leigh "Deman" Smith

Observers
 Yanko "YNk" Paunović
 Simon "pAn" Schumacher

Others
 Sean Charles (Reporting)
 Soe "Soembie" Gschwind-Penski (Esports in Cinemas)

Broadcasts
All streams were broadcast on Twitch in various languages.
{| cellspacing="10"
|-
| valign="top" width="2000px" |
 

  ESL CSGO
  99Damage
  Bebe
  BiDa
  Castpoint
  CNONE
  ESL China
  ESL CZSK
  ESL Italy
  ESL Poland
  ESL Spain
  ESL Turkey
  Fraglider
  GPlayTV
  Hungarian Esport TV
  KeitaTV
  Mito
  NVIDIA France
  ON
  Storm Studio
  striimIT
  Strimok
  VsnT
  WeAreInVICtus

Teams

Group Stage 1

Group A

Group B

Group C

Group D

Group Stage 2

Group E

Group F

Group G

Group H

Playoffs

Bracket

Quarterfinals

Team EnVyUs vs. Natus Vincere

Casters: Anders Blume, Deman, & JKaplan

Team SoloMid vs. Team Kinguin

Casters: Pansy, HenryG, & Machine

Virtus.pro vs. Ninjas in Pyjamas

Casters: Anders Blume, Semmler, & moses

Fnatic vs. Luminosity Gaming

Casters: Deman, Joe Miller, & Fifflaren

Semifinals

Team EnVyUs vs. Team SoloMid

Casters: Anders Blume, Semmler, & moses

Virtus.pro vs. Fnatic

Casters: Pansy, Machine, & Fifflaren

Finals

Casters: Deman, Anders Blume, & HenryG

With its third title, Fnatic would be the only team to win back-to-back majors and have multiple titles until SK Gaming, which won MLG Columbus 2016 and ESL One Cologne 2016. Flusha was named the most valuable player of Cologne 2015.

Final standings

References

External links
 Official page

2015 in German sport
2015 in esports
Sports competitions in Cologne
Counter-Strike: Global Offensive Majors
ESL One Counter-Strike competitions